The 1993 Philippine Basketball Association (PBA) rookie draft was an event at which teams drafted players from the amateur ranks. It was held on January 17, 1993, at the Rigodon Ballroom of the Manila Peninsula.

Round 1

Round 2

Round 3

Round 4

Round 5

Round 6

Round 7

Notes
 Victor Pablo, the second overall pick, was later traded by Ginebra to Seven Up, in exchange for center Manny Victorino, when Pablo held up in contract negotiations.
 The Draft reached the seventh round with Swift Mighty Meaties choosing three more players including an EARIST cager Eugenio Reyes.
 Purefoods' pick Victor Villarias' elder brother Vernie was a first-round pick by the Hotdogs two years earlier; this was the only instance in Purefoods' history that brothers were selected in the two separate drafts.

Sources
 "Sta. Lucia set to pick Limpot in PBA draft," The Philippine Star, January 17, 1993
 "Sta. Lucia confident of signing Limpot," The Philippine Star, January 18, 1993
 "Pablo-Victorino trade eyed; more transfers likely," The Philippine Star, January 24, 1993

References

Philippine Basketball Association draft
draft